The 2021 Canadian Premier League season was the third season of the Canadian Premier League, the top level of Canadian soccer. Forge FC were defending champions, after defeating HFX Wanderers FC in the 2020 final.

The season was planned to commence on May 22, the Victoria Day weekend, pending the approval of government authorities and the state of the COVID-19 pandemic in Canada. However, on May 14, it was announced that the start was to be pushed back to mid-June or early July.

On June 5, the league committed to a full 28-match season, but that the season would begin in a single-site bubble at IG Field in Winnipeg, Manitoba, promoted as "The Kickoff", with each team playing eight matches between June 26 and July 24. All matches were played behind closed doors and in compliance with Manitoba public health orders. On July 30, the CPL began to play matches at home venues.

Pacific FC defeated two-time champions and title holders Forge FC in the final to win their first title.

Team and rule changes
The same eight clubs that participated in the 2020 Canadian Premier League season competed in 2021. York United FC participated under their new name for the first time, having previously been known as York9 FC.

Teams were required to play Canadian players aged 21 years or younger for a minimum of 1,500 minutes this season, increased from 1,000 minutes. The maximum team compensation for this season was $1.2 million split between players and coaching staff. The required spend on player compensation was $650,000 to $850,000.

Teams

Stadiums and locations

Personnel and sponsorship

Number of teams by province or territory

Coaching changes

Regular season

Format
Between June 26 and July 24, teams played their first eight games at IG Field in Winnipeg. Teams from Eastern Canada and Western Canada played two matches against each of the four teams in the opposite region to reduce travel when teams return to home stadiums. For the remainder of the season, teams played 16 games against opponents from their own region and 4 against opponents from the opposite region.

Table

Results

The Kickoff

West

East

Combined

Playoffs
The top-four teams in the regular season qualified for the league playoffs. The first-place team hosted the fourth, and the second-place team hosted the third in a single match round. The winners advanced to the CPL Final, a single match hosted by the higher-seeded team.

If a match was level at the end of normal playing time, extra time would be played (two periods of 15 minutes each) and followed, if necessary, by a penalty shoot-out to determine the winner. If a match reached extra time, each team was allowed to make an additional substitution.

Matches

Semi-finals

Final

Awards

Canadian Premier League Awards 
On December 4, 2021, the Canadian Premier League revealed the nominees for the four individual awards that would be voted on by the media. These four awards plus the Golden Boot award are given based on performance over the whole season including Finals. The awards are Inuit soapstone sculptures designed by artists from Cape Dorset, Nunavut. The winners were announced at a ceremony on December 14.

Team of the Week 
The Gatorade Team of the Week is selected by OneSoccer staff.

Statistical leaders

Top scorers

Top assists

|}

Clean sheets

Hat-tricks

|}

Player transfers

U Sports Draft 

The 2021 CPL–U Sports Draft was held virtually on January 29. Draftees are invited to team preseason camps, with an opportunity to earn a developmental contract and retain their U Sports men's soccer eligibility. FC Edmonton selected Thomas Gardner with the first overall pick. Two players were selected by each CPL team, with a total of 16 players being drafted including 12 Canadians.

Foreign players 
Canadian Premier League teams could sign a maximum of seven international players, out of which only five could be in the starting line-up for each match. Starting this season, teams were required to carry a minimum of four international players, either signed through or approved by the league's scouting partner, 21st Club. The following players were considered foreign players for the 2021 season. This list does not include Canadian citizens who represent other countries at the international level.

{| class="wikitable"
|+
! style="width:8%"|Club
! Player 1
! Player 2
! Player 3
! Player 4
! Player 5
! Player 6
! Player 7
! Former Players
|-
|Atlético Ottawa
| Viti Martínez
| Vashon Neufville
| Tevin Shaw
| Miguel Acosta
| Rafael Núñez
| Alberto Soto
| Raúl Uche
|
|-
|Cavalry
| José Escalante
| Richard Luca
| Tom Field
| Daan Klomp
| Joe Mason
|
|
|
|-
|FC Edmonton
| Jeannot Esua
| Ramón Soria
| Sharly Mabussi
| Tobias Warschewski
| Hunter Gorskie
| Roberto Avila
| Azriel Gonzalez
| Raúl Tito
|-
|Forge
| Alexander Achinioti-Jönsson
| Elimane Cissé
| Daniel Krutzen
| Paolo Sabak
| Joshua Navarro
| Omar Browne
|
|
|-
|HFX Wanderers
| Akeem Garcia
| Andre Rampersad
| Peter Schaale
| Alex Marshall
| João Morelli
| Eriks Santos
| Cory Bent
|
|-
|Pacific
| Alejandro Díaz
| Ollie Bassett
| Gianni dos Santos
|
|
|
|
|
|-
|Valour
| José Galán
| Arnold Bouka Moutou
| Andrew Jean-Baptiste
| Amir Soto
| Moses Dyer
| Rafael Galhardo
| Rodrigo Reyes
|
|-
|York United
| Álvaro Rivero
| Nicholas Hamilton
| Julian Ulbricht
| Gerard Lavergne
| Osvaldo Ramírez
| Sebastián Gutiérrez
|
|
|}
Players in italic'' denote players new to their respective clubs for the 2021 season, sorted chronologically by their announcement.

References

 
Canadian Premier League seasons
Canadian Premier League
Canadian Premier League